During World War II, Operation Meridian was part of a series of British air attacks directed at Japanese-held oil refineries on Sumatra. Meridian had two phases: Meridian One on 24 January 1945 and Meridian Two on 29 January. As a result, the critical aviation fuel output of the plants at Palembang was reduced by seventy-five percent.

The attacks 
The attacks were made by aircraft from the British Task Force 63, en route to Sydney, Australia, where it translated into the British Pacific Fleet and subsequently participated in the support of the Allied invasion of Okinawa (Operation Iceberg). Refuelling at sea was needed and this was supplied by Task Force 69 of the British Eastern Fleet, three escorted tankers.

Task Force 63 left Trincomalee in Ceylon on 13 January 1945, for Sumatra. On 20 January, Task Force 63 rendezvoused with Task Force 69 and refuelled with great difficulty because of gusting winds and a troublesome swell. The oilers complained of much pumping gear being damaged.

The first attack Operation Meridian One, an air strike on the oil refinery at Pladjoe, north of Palembang, Sumatra was delayed by poor weather from 21 January and the fleet waited off Enggano Island. The attack was finally launched at 6am on 24 January with a lack of wind making take-off more risky.

Forty-three Grumman Avenger torpedo bombers, twelve Fairey Firefly fighter-bombers with rockets and fifty Grumman Hellcat, Vought Corsair and Supermarine Seafire fighters were launched, approaching with the sun behind them and diving from 9000 feet to 3000 feet to release their bombs. Despite the presence of barrage balloons the refinery was successfully attacked. Losses were heavier than on previous raids; 32 aircraft were lost due to enemy action and crash landings. Avenger squadrons that participated included 820, 849, 854 and 857 Naval Air Squadrons.

The fleet refuelled again on 26–27 January. In practice, this was unsatisfactory as, with a mixture of poor weather and inexperience, the tankers suffered damage as ships failed to keep station and hoses parted.

On 29 January, the second raid, Operation Meridian Two, an air strike against the oil refinery at Soengei Gerong, Sumatra, was undertaken. Despite poor visibility, the flying-off was delayed by less than half an hour and the air strike was made against the oil refinery. Allied aviators claimed 30 Japanese planes shot down in dog-fights and another 38 destroyed on the ground, for the loss of 16 British aircraft. A small Japanese counterattack was attempted, but was defeated by fighter cover and anti-aircraft fire.

Task Force 63 refueled from Task Force 69 for the final time on 30 January and sailed for Fremantle, Western Australia. Task Force 69 returned to Trincomalee.

Allied order of battle
The ships involved in Operation Meridian were:

Force 63: (Rear Admiral Philip Vian): 
Aircraft carriers 
, Illustrious, Indefatigable and Victorious 
Battleship 
 
Anti-aircraft cruisers: 
, Black Prince and Euryalus,  
Destroyer Flotilla 25 
HMS Grenville, Undine, Ursa and Undaunted
Destroyer Flotilla 27 
HMS Kempenfelt, Wakeful, Whirlwind, Wager, Whelp and Wessex (from 19 January 1945)

Force 69
Light cruiser 
HMS Ceylon 
Destroyer 
HMS Urchin 
Oilers
Wave King, Echodale, Empire Salvage

See also
Operation Boomerang

References

External links
Royal Navy in the Indian and Pacific Oceans
Leading Air Mechanic Maurice Whiteing and his photographic record of HMS Indomitable in the Indian and Pacific Oceans, 1944-45, including the Palembang Raid
Operation Meridian I - Codenames : Operations of WW2
Operation Meridian II - Codenames : Operations of WW2

Palembang
Indian Ocean operations of World War II
World War II aerial operations and battles of the Pacific theatre
Aerial operations and battles of World War II involving the United Kingdom
Naval battles and operations of World War II involving the United Kingdom